Ulrike Huber (born 27 April 1966) is an Austrian handball player who played for the Austria women's national handball team. She represented Austria at the 1984 Summer Olympics in Los Angeles.

References

1966 births
Living people
Austrian female handball players
Olympic handball players of Austria
Handball players at the 1984 Summer Olympics